The 6th Annual TV Week Logie Awards were presented on Saturday 21 March 1964 aboard the Lloyd Triestino cruise liner Marconi Liber in Sydney. The winner of the Gold Logie was Bobby Limb. The awards were broadcast on the Nine Network. This article lists the winners of Logie Awards (Australian television) for 1964:

Awards

Gold Logie
Most Popular Personality on Australian Television
Winner:
Bobby Limb

Logie

National
Best Overseas Show
Winner:
Bonanza

Best Male Singer
Winner:
Bill Newman

Best Female Singer
Winner:
Robyn Alvarez

Best Commercial
Winner:
Coca-Cola

Best National Variety Show
Winner:
The Delo and Daly Show

Outstanding Newscoverage
Winner:
Federal Election

Best Children's Entertainment
Winner:
Aladdin

Outstanding Documentary
Winner:
Bob Raymond, for work at TCN and Four Corners

Victoria
Most Popular Male
Joint Winners:
Graham Kennedy & Bert Newton

Most Popular Female 
Winner:
Rosie Sturgess

Most Popular Program
Winner:
Noel Ferrier's I.M.T.

New South Wales
Most Popular Male
Winner:
Dave Allen

Most Popular Female
Winner:
Judy Stone

Most Popular Program 
Winner:
Tonight with Dave Allen

South Australia
Most Popular Male 
Winner:
Ernie Sigley

Most Popular Female 
Winner:
Glenys O'Brien

Most Popular Program
Winner:
Country and Western Hour

Queensland
Most Popular Male 
Winner:
George Wallace Jnr

Most Popular Female 
Winner:
Jackie Ellison

Most Popular Program
Winner:
Theatre Royal

Tasmania
Most Popular Personality
Winner:
Graeme Smith

Special Achievement Award
Special Award for Outstanding Production
Winner:
Bandstand

Special Award for Recording
Winner:
Rob E.G. (Robie Porter)

External links

Australian Television: 1962-1965 Logie Awards 
TV Week Logie Awards: 1964

1964 television awards
1964 in Australian television
1964